Driving Park was a harness racing track in Rochester, New York which operated between 1874 and 1902.

The track was an irregular oval with a distance of one mile, and was described as "the fastest mile track in the United States." It was located on the north-west corner of Driving Park Avenue and Dewey Avenue, then called The Boulevard, in Rochester.

From 1875 to 1895 the track hosted a leg of the Grand Circuit. For a time it was "the most famous racetrack in the world," but began to decline in the 1890s with the introduction of anti-gambling laws. In 1899 two of the three grandstands were destroyed in a fire, and the park was finally sold at auction in 1902.

Today the former location of the park is a residential area.

References

See also
 Driving Park station

1874 establishments in New York (state)
1902 establishments in New York (state)
Sports venues in Monroe County, New York
Harness racing venues in the United States
Horse racing venues in New York (state)
Sports venues in Rochester, New York
Sports venues completed in 1874